House Detective is a television program on HGTV from 2008-2012, based on an original concept proposed by nationally syndicated home inspection columnist Barry Stone. In its original format, the program featured two home inspections per half-hour installment. The inspections typically took place in a particular greater metropolitan area, such as Washington, DC;  San Francisco, CA; Los Angeles, CA, or far Upstate NY. In a typical installment, a young couple foolishly purchase a house without requesting a home inspection and experience problems. HGTV's producers then appear, accompanied by a professional home inspector. The inspector inspects the house and systematically find problems.  The problems were revealed in a fashion calculated to maximize drama and opportunities for puns (usually related to the occupation(s) of the home owner(s)). The discovery of dangerous problems was accompanied by frightening mood music, even if the problems could be repaired easily and inexpensively. In the end, the condition of the house nearly always turned out to be better than feared, and the featured homeowner would rally to the cause of fixing the problems. After each inspection, a brief segment called "Inspector's Notebook" offered viewers helpful advice on specific topics mentioned in the preceding inspection.

In a later incarnation, House Detective was changed to a one-inspection-per-show format, with the latter half devoted to fixing problems discovered in the first half. The show's format was changed to target a wealthier, more contemporary audience, with the show featuring more style and less comedy.

External links
HGTV House Detective Show (Internet Archive capture 2007/02/21)
CA Inspector Barry Stone's House Detective Website
DC Inspector Reggie Marston's Website
Upstate NY Inspector Tom Sherman's Website

HGTV original programming